Robert James Wood (27 March 1886 – 8 August 1954) was a Liberal party member of the House of Commons of Canada. He was born in Teulon, Manitoba and became a merchant by career.

He was elected at Norquay, a Manitoba riding which only existed for the 1949 general election before it was dissolved in 1952. Wood then became the Liberal candidate at Selkirk, an electoral district which he unsuccessfully campaigned in for the 1945 election. Wood returned to Parliament after his victory at Selkirk in the 1953 election. However, he died in office before completing his term in the 22nd Canadian Parliament.

References

External links
 

1886 births
1954 deaths
Canadian merchants
Liberal Party of Canada MPs
Members of the House of Commons of Canada from Manitoba